Union High School may refer to:

United States
Natchez Union High School, Natchez, Mississippi 
Redondo Union High School, Los Angeles, California
Union High School (Modoc), Modoc, Indiana
Union High School (Dugger), Dugger, Indiana
Union High School (Iowa), La Porte City, Iowa
Union High School (Grand Rapids, Michigan)
Union High School (Missouri), Union, Missouri
Union High School (New Jersey), Union Township, Union County, New Jersey
Union High School (North Carolina), Delway, North Carolina
Union High School (Oklahoma), Tulsa, Oklahoma
Union High School (Oregon), Union, Oregon
Union High School-Main Street Grammar School, Union, South Carolina
Union High School (Utah), Roosevelt, Utah
Union High School (Big Stone Gap, Virginia)
Union High School (Camas, Washington)
Union High School (Black River Falls, Wisconsin)

South Africa
Union High School (Graaff-Reinet), Eastern Cape, South Africa

See also
Union County High School (Georgia), Blairsville, Georgia
Union County High School (Kentucky), Morganfield, Kentucky